The Portuguese men's national handball team is governed by the Portuguese Handball Federation and competes in international competitions such as the European Men's Handball Championship and the IHF World Men's Handball Championship. They have participated five times in the World Championship (1997, 2001, 2003, 2021, 2023), reaching an all-time best tenth place in 2021, and seven times in the European Championship (1994, 2000, 2002, 2004, 2006, 2020, 2022), with a sixth place in 2020 as their best placing. They participated for the first time in the men's Olympic handball tournament at the 2020 Summer Olympics in Tokyo, finishing in ninth place.

Competitive record
Portugal has competed four times at the World Championship (1997, 2001, 2003 and 2021) and seven times at the European Championship (1994, 2000, 2002, 2004, 2006, 2020 and 2022). They qualified automatically for the final tournament of the World Championship in 2003 and of the inaugural edition European Championship in 1994 as the host team. Portugal's best results are a tenth place (main round) at the World Championship in 2021, and a sixth place (second round) at the European Championship in 2020.

Olympic Games

World Championship

European Championship

* Colored background indicates that medal was won on the tournament.
** Red border color indicates that tournament was held on home soil.

Team

Current squad
Squad for the 2023 World Men's Handball Championship.

Head coach: Paulo Pereira

Notable former coaches
 Mircea Costache
 Mats Olsson
 Aleksander Donner

Player statistics

Most appearances

Top scorers

References

External links

IHF profile

Men's national handball teams
Handball
Handball in Portugal